The LSU Lady Tigers track and field team represents Louisiana State University in NCAA Division I women's indoor and outdoor track and field.

History
The Lady Tiger program began in August 1978. The LSU Lady Tigers track and field program is the premier women's track and field program in the NCAA, winning more NCAA championships than any other school in history.  The Lady Tigers have won a total of 25 NCAA championships (11 indoor, 14 outdoor). The closest school is Texas with 10 total championships. The Lady Tigers won their first NCAA championship in 1987 under head coach Sam Seemes. The following year Pat Henry took over the program and led the team to an unprecedented 11 straight NCAA outdoor championships, the most consecutive NCAA titles by a women's team in any NCAA sport. In 2004, Dennis Shaver became the LSU Lady Tigers head coach. He coached the team to the 2008 NCAA outdoor championship.

The first Lady Tiger team formed in August of 1978 following Title IX mandates.  The first meet was an indoor meet on Dec. 9, 1978 at Carl Maddox Field House on the LSU campus.  Gold and Silver Olympic medalist Pam Jiles from New Orleans, La. was on the first team. Another notable Lady Tiger was shotputter Donna Brazile also from New Orleans.  Other members of the first team were, Stacy Allen, hurdler, from Metairie, La.; Leila Byrne, sprinter; Vicky Dunn, sprinter; Caroline Favorite,sprinter; Lynnette Favorite, sprinter; Joanie Hathorn; Paula Hayden, middle distance/distance, from Adams Massachusetts; Lourdes Maristany, middle distance/distance from New Orleans, La.; Dr. Marguerite Miranne Rosales, middle distance, from New Orleans; La, Donna Otzenberger Kivirauma, middle distance/distance from Baton Rouge, La; Elaine Smith, sprinter; Athena Thomas, sprinter; Carin Thorp, Sprinter; and Lynn Tutzauer, middle distance/distance. 

Kimberlyn Duncan became the first from LSU to win The Bowerman, an award that honors collegiate track & field's most outstanding athlete of the year. In 2012, she became the first woman in NCAA Division I history to win back-to-back indoor and outdoor national titles in the 200 meters.

Team Finishes

Bold indicates NCAA national championship
Source:

NCAA championships

Team

Event

Indoor

Source:

Outdoor

Source:

Stadiums

Carl Maddox Field House

Carl Maddox Field House built in 1975 is the indoor track and field home arena for the LSU Lady Tigers and LSU Tigers track and field teams. The arena has a seating capacity of 3,000. The field house features a 200-meter unbanked track, elevated jump runways, a variety of throwing areas and multiple high jump and vaulting areas. In 1998, the arena was renamed in honor of former LSU Athletic Director Carl Maddox.

Bernie Moore Track Stadium

Bernie Moore Track Stadium built in 1969 is the outdoor track and field home stadium for the LSU Lady Tigers and LSU Tigers track and field teams. The stadium has a seating capacity of 5,680. In 1971, the stadium was renamed after former LSU football and track & field coach, Bernie Moore.  Moore coached the LSU Track and Field teams for 18 years (1930–47) and led the Tigers to their first NCAA National Championship in 1933 as well as 12 SEC crowns.

Training facilities

Bernie Moore Track Stadium weight room
Opened in January 2003, the weight room is for the LSU Tigers track and field and LSU Lady Tigers track and field team's. The LSU track and field weight room is a 2,000 square foot facility designed for an Olympic style lifting program. Located adjacent to the track, the weight room features 10 multi-purpose power stations, 5 dumbbell stations, 4 power racks, 5 sets of competition plates, 10 competition Olympic bars, 2 multi-purpose racks, an assortment of selectorized machines and 2 televisions for multimedia presentations.

Head coaches

References

External links
 

 
Sports clubs established in 1980
1980 establishments in Louisiana